Pseudoduganella danionis is a Gram-negative and rod-shaped bacterium from the genus of Pseudoduganella which has been isolated from the zebrafish (Danio rerio).

References

External links
Type strain of Pseudoduganella danionis at BacDive -  the Bacterial Diversity Metadatabase

Burkholderiales
Bacteria described in 2016